Spatalla mollis, the woolly spoon, is a flower-bearing shrub that belongs to the genus Spatalla and forms part of the fynbos. The plant is native to the Western Cape, South Africa.

Description
The plant dies after a fire but the seeds survive. The plant is bisexual and pollinated by insects. Two months after the plant has flowered, the ripe seeds fall to the ground where they are spread by ants.

Distribution and habitat
The plant occurs in the Hottentots Holland Mountains, Groenlandberg to Kleinmondberg.

References

External references
Threatened Species Programme | SANBI Red List of South African Plants
Woolly Unispoon
Spatalla mollis R.Br.
Spatalla mollis R.Br. 1810 bl 100

mollis